Washint (Amharic: ዋሽንት) is an end-blown wooden flute originally used in Ethiopia. Traditionally, Amharic musicians would pass on their oral history through song accompanied by the washint as well as the krar, a six stringed lyre, and the masenqo, a one string fiddle.

Occurrence 

Along with the Krar and the Masenqo, the Washint flute is one of the most widespread and ubiquitous musical instruments of the Amharas.

The washint is a favorite among the shepherds and cowherders.

Construction and design 
The washint can be constructed using bamboo, wood or other cane, and increasingly flutes of metal and plastic tubes can be seen.  Varieties exists in different lengths and relative fingerhole placement, and a performer might use several different flutes over the course of a performance to accommodate different song types. It generally has four finger-holes, which allows the player to create a pentatonic scale.

See also
 Ney, a flute of similar construction found in Middle Eastern Music
 Ney (Turkish), a Turkish flute of similar construction
 Kaval, a similar wind instrument found in Azerbaijan, Turkey, Macedonia and Bulgaria
 Music of Ethiopia - historical overview of music tradition of Ethiopia 
 Krar, five or six-stranded bowl-shaped lyre used in Ethiopia and Eritrea
 Masenqo, single-stranded bowed lute in Ethiopian-Eritrean tradition.

References

External links

Audio examples and pictures
 Washint tune played before entranced crowd (on EthioTube site part of YouTube)
 Boy mimicking Washint sound (on YouTube)
 Washint played by non Ethiopian (on YouTube)
 Ethiopian instruments images on the sidebar

End-blown flutes
Ethiopian musical instruments